The Craon family was a French noble house, known to date back to the 11th century, originating in Craon in the Mayenne region of Anjou, northern France.

Its most famous member is Pierre de Craon, and its last representative governed Burgundy for a time under Louis XI, after the death of Charles le Téméraire.  When the Craon family died out, the Beauvau family took the title of Craon since one of its members had married the heir to that name.  Jeanne de Craon, dying at the birth of her son Jean IV de Beauvau, demanded that he take the arms of the Craon family.